The National Undersea Research Center for the North Atlantic and Great Lakes (NURC-NA&GL) is one of six undersea centers established by the National Oceanic and Atmospheric Administration's Undersea Research Program. It is co-located with the University of Connecticut’s Department of Marine Sciences. The center's mission includes supporting regional and national oceanography research and promoting awareness of the oceanic ecosystem through educational outreach programs.

External links
 NURC-NAGL home page

National Oceanic and Atmospheric Administration
Oceanographic organizations